Lyot may refer to:
Bernard Lyot, French astronomer
Lyot filter
Lyot stop
Lyot depolarizer
 Lyot (lunar crater)
 Lyot (Martian crater)
2452 Lyot, asteroid
Bernard Lyot Telescope